Jos Luhukay (born 13 June 1963) is a Dutch football manager and former player, who was most recently head coach of VVV-Venlo.

Playing career
He began his career at the age of 15 at his hometown club FC VVV and he made his league debut in January 1981 against FC Den Bosch. In 1989, he went to play at SVV Schiedam, where he stayed until 1991. After playing for RKC Waalwijk from 1991 until 1993, he left his homeland for Germany, where he had two stints at SV Straelen (1993 to 1995 and 1996 to 1998), in-between playing for KFC Uerdingen from 1995 to 1996. At KFC Uerdingen, Luhukay played two games in the Bundesliga. In 1998, he quit his active career at SV Straelen. Jos Luhukay always played as midfielder.

Managerial career

Early coaching career
Just one month after the end of his career as a player, he became the manager at SV Straelen. Two years later he went to KFC Uerdingen again and in 2002 he was hired as an assistant coach at Bundesliga side 1. FC Köln. In 2005, he became manager at 2. Bundesliga team SC Paderborn 07, finishing the 2005–06 season in 9th place. He resigned there on 11 August 2006.

Borussia Mönchengladbach
On 2 January 2007, he was hired by Bundesliga side Borussia Mönchengladbach as assistant manager to Jupp Heynckes. Heynckes resigned shortly after on 31 January 2007 following a run of 13 games without a win, leaving Luhukay to take over. Luhukay was unable to save Gladbach from relegation, and they finished the 2007–08 season in 18th position in the Bundesliga. In his first full season in charge, Luhukay guided Gladbach to an immediate return to the top flight, finishing the season as 2. Bundesliga as champions with 66 points. On 5 October 2008, Luhukay was sacked by Borussia Mönchengladbach, with the team 18th in the table.

FC Augsburg
On 23 March 2009, Luhukay signed with FC Augsburg as manager, with a view to taking over on 1 July that summer. Following the sacking of Holger Fach on 15 April 2009, Luhukay stepped into the managerial role earlier than planned. In his first full season in charge, Luhukay guided Augsburg to 3rd position in the 2. Bundesliga where they met Nürnberg in the play-offs, losing 3–0 on aggregate and missing out on promotion. During this season, Augsburg also reached the semi-final of the DFB-Pokal, where they lost 2–0 to Werder Bremen. The following season, Augsburg won promotion to the Bundesliga for the first time in their history, finishing 2nd in the league. In their first season in the top flight, Augsburg finished 14th, avoiding relegation by 7 points. Luhukay resigned immediately after the final league match of the 2011–12 season after just over three years in charge.

Hertha BSC
On 17 May 2012, Luhukay became the new manager of Hertha BSC. He officially took over coaching duties on 1 July 2012. In his first game in charge on 3 August 2012, Hertha drew 2–2 with Luhukay's former club Paderborn 07. In the 2012–13 season, Hertha broke the record for the most points in a 2. Bundesliga season, winning promotion back to the top flight as league champions with 76 points. They also reached the quarter final of the DFB-Pokal. In Luhukay's second season with Hertha, they finished 11th in the Bundesliga. On 5 February 2015, Hertha sacked Luhukay, naming Pál Dárdai as replacement along with assistant Rainer Widmayer. Hertha had lost 1–0 the previous day and were 17th in the table at the time. They eventually finished 15th, avoiding the relegation play-off on goal difference.

VfB Stuttgart
On 17 May 2016, he was appointed as the new head coach of VfB Stuttgart. After conflicts with club chairman Jan Schindelmeiser, Luhukay resigned as the coach of VfB Stuttgart with immediate effect on 15 September 2016. He had a record of three wins, no draws, and two losses.

Sheffield Wednesday
On 5 January 2018, Luhukay was announced as the new manager of Sheffield Wednesday, replacing Carlos Carvalhal. Becoming the Owls' 33rd manager, Luhukay also became the first Dutch, and only the second non-British manager of the club. Luhukay's first match in charge of the club was an away match against local rivals Sheffield United, which ended in a goalless draw and saw the Owls go down to ten men following the dismissal of club captain Glenn Loovens.

His first victory as manager came on 16 January 2018, when Sheffield Wednesday defeated Carlisle United 2–0 in an FA Cup Third Round replay. Luhukay's first victory in the league came on 13 February 2018, when Sheffield Wednesday defeated Derby County 2–0 at Hillsborough.

On 21 December 2018, Luhukay was sacked by Sheffield Wednesday after a run of only 1 win and 7 defeats in 10 games with the team sitting 18th in the table.

FC St. Pauli
On 10 April 2019, Luhukay was announced as the new manager of FC St. Pauli, replacing Markus Kauczinski. He left the club on 29 June 2020.

VVV-Venlo
Lukuhay replaced Hans de Koning as manager of VVV in March 2021, only his first manager job in his home country. He left the club by mutual consent on 30 May 2022 after a disappointing season as the club finished 10th in the second tier.

Managerial statistics

Honours

Manager
Borussia Mönchengladbach
2. Bundesliga Champions: 2007–08

FC Augsburg
2. Bundesliga Runners-up: 2010–11

Hertha BSC
2. Bundesliga Champions: 2012–13

University of Utrecht
Extended Project Qualification – The Success of Dutch Managers in the English Second Tier Football: 1998–99

References

External links

1963 births
Living people
Footballers from Venlo
Dutch people of Indonesian descent
Dutch people of Moluccan descent
Indo people
Association football midfielders
Dutch footballers
VVV-Venlo players
SV SVV players
RKC Waalwijk players
SV 19 Straelen players
KFC Uerdingen 05 players
Eredivisie players
Eerste Divisie players
Bundesliga players
Oberliga (football) players
Dutch expatriate footballers
Expatriate footballers in Germany
Dutch expatriate sportspeople in Germany
Dutch football managers
KFC Uerdingen 05 managers
1. FC Köln managers
SC Paderborn 07 managers
Borussia Mönchengladbach managers
FC Augsburg managers
Hertha BSC managers
VfB Stuttgart managers
Sheffield Wednesday F.C. managers
FC St. Pauli managers
VVV-Venlo managers
Bundesliga managers
2. Bundesliga managers
Eredivisie managers
Eerste Divisie managers
Dutch expatriate football managers
Expatriate football managers in Germany
Expatriate football managers in England
Dutch expatriate sportspeople in England